Sivakorn Tiatrakul (born 7 July 1994) is a Thai professional footballer who plays as an attacking midfielder , he has also been used as a winger for Thai League 1 club Chiangrai United and the Thailand national team.

International career
In March, 2016 Sivakorn was called up in a friendly match against South Korea, but did not make an appearance.

In 2021 he was called up by Thailand national team for the 2020 AFF Championship.

International

Honours

Clubs
Look Isan
 Regional League Eastern Division (1): 2013

Chiangrai United
 Thai League 1 (1): 2019
 Thai FA Cup (3): 2017, 2018, 2020–21
 Thailand Champions Cup (2): 2018, 2020
 Thai League Cup (1): 2018

International
Thailand
 AFF Championship (1): 2020

References

External links
Sivakorn Tiatrakul at Soccerway

1994 births
Living people
Sivakorn Tiatrakul
Sivakorn Tiatrakul
Association football midfielders
Sivakorn Tiatrakul
Sivakorn Tiatrakul
Sivakorn Tiatrakul
Sivakorn Tiatrakul
Sivakorn Tiatrakul
Sivakorn Tiatrakul
Sivakorn Tiatrakul
Sivakorn Tiatrakul